Miss Grand Spain 2018 is the 3rd  edition of Miss Grand Spain beauty contest, held at Cerezo Theater, Carmona on 30 June 2018. The Miss Grand Spain 2018 is Mariola Partida Angulo from Sevilla crowned her successor, Mariola Partida Angulo then represented Spain at the Miss Grand International 2018 pageant held on October 25 in Myanmar.

Results

Special awards

Contestants
34 delegates were selected by regional licensees to compete for the national title of Miss Grand Spain 2018.

References

External links

 Miss Grand Spain official website

Grand Spain
Miss Grand Spain
Beauty pageants in Spain